St. Paul's Episcopal Church is an historic Episcopal church building located at 404 DeSmet Street, now 312 2nd Avenue,  South West, in Rugby, Pierce County, North Dakota. Designed in the Late Gothic Revival style of architecture by noted Grand Forks architect Joseph Bell DeRemer, it was built in 1903 to 1905 of local fieldstone with concrete mortar and wooden gables and roof. Its stained glass windows which came from Holy Trinity Parish in New York City and arrived in poor condition were refitted by members of the congregation. Around 1968 the church closed and remained vacant until 1991 when a local undertaker bought it. On December 3, 1992, it was added to the National Register of Historic Places.

Today the building is home to the Victorian Dress Museum and Boutique, which features reproductions of Victorian dresses and accessories.

References

Episcopal church buildings in North Dakota
Fashion museums in the United States
Gothic Revival church buildings in North Dakota
Joseph Bell DeRemer buildings
Museums in Pierce County, North Dakota
Churches on the National Register of Historic Places in North Dakota
Churches completed in 1903
Stone churches in North Dakota
National Register of Historic Places in Pierce County, North Dakota
1903 establishments in North Dakota
Rugby, North Dakota